is a traditional Japanese drawstring bag, used like a handbag (similar to the English reticule) for carrying around personal possessions; smaller ones are usually used to carry loose coinage (similar to a ), cosmetics, lucky charms, hand warmers and other small items. Larger versions can be used to carry  (packed lunchboxes) and utensils, as well as other larger possessions.

See also

External links 

Bags (fashion)
Japanese fashion
Japanese words and phrases
Textile arts of Japan